Mohammad Jafar Moradi (born 10 April 1990) is an Iranian long distance runner. He competed in the marathon at the 2015 World Championships and 2016 Olympics. He has a degree in physical education from the Islamic Azad University, Tehran.

References

External links
 

1990 births
Living people
Iranian male long-distance runners
Iranian male marathon runners
World Athletics Championships athletes for Iran
Place of birth missing (living people)